The Taxation of Chargeable Gains Act 1992 (c 12) is an Act of Parliament which governs the levying of capital gains tax in the United Kingdom. This is a tax on the increase in the value of an asset between the date of purchase and the date of sale of that asset. The tax operates under two different regimes for a natural person and a body corporate.

For a natural person, the rates of the capital gains tax are the same as those for earned income. The tax is levied at a rate determined by the highest rate of income tax which that person pays. Each year a natural person has an amount of gain, fixed by law, which is exempt from tax.

By contrast, for bodies corporate, the chargeable gain is treated as additional profits for the accounting period in question. The capital gains tax is charged as additional corporation tax. Bodies corporate have no allowance for gains free from tax.

Various reliefs from capital gains tax exist. These include indexation relief, where the amount of gain subject to tax is reduced by factoring in general price inflation, and taper relief, where set percentages of the gain are exempt from tax if the asset has been held for a certain length of time.

The Act has been amended yearly by subsequent Finance Acts.

See also
Income Tax Act 2007, regarding taxation of income, such as from work or dividends
Corporation Tax Act 2010 (c 4), regarding taxation of corporations' income
Value Added Tax Act 1994

References

External links

United Kingdom Acts of Parliament 1992
Tax legislation in the United Kingdom